Myristica is a genus of trees in the family Myristicaceae. There are over 150 species, distributed in Asia and the western Pacific.

The type species of the genus, and the most economically important member, is Myristica fragrans (the nutmeg tree), from which mace is also derived.

Etymology
The name  is from the Greek adjective , meaning ‘fragrant, for anointing’, referring to its early use. 
The adjective is from the noun  (‘perfume, ointment, anointing oil’).

Description
All or nearly all species are dioecious. Knuth (1904) however cites a report of trees being male in their sex expression when young and female
later.  Perianth of one whorl of three largely united segments. Stamens two to thirty, partly or wholly united. The ovary is superior, consisting of a single uniovulate carpel. 

Selected species

There are 171 accepted Myristica species as of April 2021 according to Plants of the World Online.  
Selected species include:

Myristica alba 
Myristica andamanica 
Myristica arfakensis 
Myristica argentea 
Myristica atrescens 
Myristica basilanica 
Myristica brachypoda 
Myristica brevistipes 
Myristica buchneriana 
Myristica byssacea 
Myristica ceylanica 
Myristica cinnamomea 
Myristica coacta 
Myristica colinridsdalei 
Myristica conspersa 
Myristica corticata 
Myristica crassa 
Myristica dactyloides 
Myristica dasycarpa 
Myristica depressa 
Myristica devogelii 
Myristica elliptica 
Myristica extensa 
Myristica fasciculata 
Myristica filipes 
Myristica fissurata 
Myristica flavovirens 
Myristica fragrans 
Myristica frugifera 
Myristica gigantea 
Myristica gillespieana 
Myristica globosa 
Myristica grandifolia 
Myristica guadalcanalensis 
Myristica guatteriifolia 
Myristica guillauminiana 
Myristica hollrungii 
Myristica inaequalis 
Myristica incredibilis 
Myristica iners 
Myristica inundata 
Myristica kalkmanii 
Myristica kjellbergii 
Myristica lasiocarpa 
Myristica lepidota 
Myristica leptophylla 
Myristica lowiana 
Myristica macrantha 
Myristica magnifica 
Myristica maingayi 
Myristica malabarica 
Myristica maxima 
Myristica mediterranea 
Myristica millepunctata 
Myristica nana 
Myristica olivacea 
Myristica ornata 
Myristica ovicarpa 
Myristica pachycarpidia 
Myristica papillatifolia 
Myristica perlaevis 
Myristica petiolata 
Myristica philippensis 
Myristica pilosella 
Myristica pilosigemma 
Myristica psilocarpa 
Myristica pubicarpa 
Myristica pygmaea 
Myristica robusta 
Myristica sangowoensis 
Myristica sarcantha 
Myristica schlechteri 
Myristica simulans 
Myristica sinclairii 
Myristica sogeriensis 
Myristica tamrauensis 
Myristica trianthera 
Myristica tubiflora 
Myristica ultrabasica 
Myristica verruculosa 
Myristica xylocarpa 
Myristica yunnanensis 

Some species of Myristica have been reclassified into the genus Virola by some botanical authorities.
Taxa that have been reassigned, or otherwise removed from the genus include:

 M. ampliata
 M. irya
 M. polyantha
 M. succadanea
 M. teijsmannii

References

 
Myristicaceae genera